Events from 2023 in the Northern Mariana Islands.

Incumbents 

 Governor: Ralph Torres (until 9 January); Arnold Palacios (from 9 January)
 Lieutenant Governor: Arnold Palacios (until 9 January); David M. Apatang (from 9 January)

Events 
Ongoing – COVID-19 pandemic in the Northern Mariana Islands

 9 January – Arnold Palacios takes over as Governor.

Deaths 

4 February – Edward Pangelinan, politician (born 1941).

References 

2023 in the Northern Mariana Islands
2020s in the Northern Mariana Islands
Years of the 21st century in the Northern Mariana Islands
Northern Mariana Islands